ESPN Radio SportsCenter is a news recap segment on ESPN Radio that airs during talk programming and sometimes live games coverage, usually by separate anchors. There are two updates an hour, at the top of the hour and 30 minutes past.

Background 
ESPN Radio's marquee segment lasts between one minute and two and a half minutes (depending on time of day) and includes scores, stats, news and sound bites. During the updates, the SportsCenter theme music plays throughout. ESPN Radio SportsCenter is heard during marquee programs such as Mike and Mike in the Morning. It is also heard every twenty minutes during MLB and NBA broadcasts on ESPN Radio. It can also be heard on certain EA Sports games that include ESPN integration. The updates can be accessed on demand using the ESPN mobile app.

The morning ESPN Radio SportsCenter anchors were Bob Picozzi and Christine Lisi. As of August 30, 2010, Mike Greenberg anchored the updates during Mike and Mike leaving to do Get Up! on ESPN in 2018. Dan Davis, who is an ESPN Radio original broadcaster, controlled the midday updates, while Marc Kestecher and formerly Jon Stashower were there in the evening. The late night crew usually switched between Neil Jackson and Jay Reynolds. Most of the ESPN Radio SportsCenter anchors also have other assignments from ESPN; for instance, Bob Picozzi also did play-by-play for Big East basketball on ESPN and Fox.

Schedule

Monday-Friday

See also
List of ESPN Radio personalities

References
ESPN Radio

External links
ESPN Radio

SportsCenter
SportsCenter